Omololu Falobi (1971-October 5, 2006) was a Nigerian journalist, and AIDS activist. In 1997, he co-founded JAAIDS. The Omololu Falobi Award was created in his name. 

In 1998, he co-founded JAAIDS, a non-governmental organization bringing together journalists from across the country to educate the population about the dangers of AIDS and how to prevent it. In 2004 and 2005, he was a representative on the board of the Joint United Nations Programme on HIV/AIDS.  

He was killed on October 5, 2006 in Lagos, around 10 p.m.;  he had just left his association's headquarters in Lagos. His assassins allegedly followed him and shot him several times.

Family 
He was married to Aderonke Falobi and was the father of three children, Ayomide, Olamide, and Aramide Falobi.

References

External links 
 Farewell to a Fearless Advocate 2006
 https://nigeria-aids.org/

Nigerian journalists
HIV/AIDS activists
1971 births
2006 deaths